Paul Carter may refer to:

Sports
 Paul Carter (1910s pitcher) (1894–1984), Major League Baseball pitcher
 Paul Carter (1930s pitcher) (1900–?), American Negro leagues baseball player
 Paul Carter (squash player) (born 1963), English squash player
 Paul Carter (darts player) (born 1974), English darts player
 Paul Carter (basketball) (born 1987), American basketball player
 Paul Carter (rugby league) (born 1992), Australian rugby league footballer

Others
 Paul Carter (entrepreneur) (1927–1979), American entrepreneur and businessman in Chattanooga, Tennessee
 Paul Carter (academic) (born 1951), British historian, writer, artist and interdisciplinary scholar at the University of Melbourne
 Paul Carter (artist) (1970–2006), Scottish artist
 Paul D. Carter (born 1980), Australian teacher and author
 Paul Carter (songwriter) (born 1988), English songwriter and music producer
 Sir Paul Carter (politician), British politician

See also
 Paul Carter Harrison (born 1936), American playwright and professor